Khirbet el-Mastarah is an archaeological site that includes the largest of the complex oval compound type habitation sites located in the middle Jordan Valley in the West Bank.

Location
These surrounding hills cause the  site to be hidden from view.

Excavation history

The site was discovered and surveyed in April 2004 by Adam Zertal during the course of the Manasseh Hill Country Survey.

An excavation directed by David Ben-Shlomo and Ralph K. Hawkins took place in June 2017. During the course of the excavation a number of large and small rounded and oval enclosures of single-course limestone rubble walls were discovered, all of them almost entirely empty of finds.

Significance
The site's hidden location most probably indicates the presence of a new population migrating to the central hill country from the east during Iron I, avoiding contact with the native population. On this basis the excavation directors believe the site is possibly an early Israelite site, constructed during the early stages of the Israelite Settlement.

References

Bibliography

External links
 Jordan Valley Excavation Project - Khirbet el-Mastarah
 Biblical Archaeology Society - Khirbet el-Mastarah Dig information
 Haaretz article: Is This Where the Israelites Camped on Their Way to Canaan 3,200 Years Ago?

Archaeological sites in the West Bank
2004 archaeological discoveries